Port au Bras is a settlement in Newfoundland and Labrador.

In 1929 a large Tsunami struck the Burin Peninsula, caused by a 7.2 magnitude earthquake about 265km off the coast. The tsunami killed 28 people and caused approximately $1 million in damages across the entire peninsula. Port au Bras was one of the worst affected neighbourhoods due to the long narrow bay around which the settlement is built, which caused water level to rise by between 13 and 27 meters.

References

Former towns in Newfoundland and Labrador
Populated places in Newfoundland and Labrador